Vranya Pass (‘Prohod Vranya’ \'pro-hod 'vra-nya\) is the ice-covered saddle of elevation 2100 m separating Sullivan Heights from Vinson Massif in Sentinel Range, Ellsworth Mountains in Antarctica.  It is part of the glacial divide between Crosswell Glacier to the northwest and Hinkley Glacier to the east.

The saddle is named after the settlement of Vranya in Southwestern Bulgaria.

Location
US mapping in 1961, updated in 1988.

Maps
 Vinson Massif.  Scale 1:250 000 topographic map.  Reston, Virginia: US Geological Survey, 1988.
 Antarctic Digital Database (ADD). Scale 1:250000 topographic map of Antarctica. Scientific Committee on Antarctic Research (SCAR). Since 1993, regularly updated.

References
Vranya Pass Saddle. SCAR Composite Antarctic Gazetteer.
 Bulgarian Antarctic Gazetteer. Antarctic Place-names Commission. (details in Bulgarian, basic data in English)

External links
 Vranya Pass. Copernix satellite image

Mountain passes of Ellsworth Land
Bulgaria and the Antarctic